The Pende or Holu languages are a clade of Bantu languages coded Zone L.10 in Guthrie's classification. According to Nurse & Philippson (2003), they form a valid node together with a couple languages from Zone H:
(L10) Pende, Samba–Holu, Kwese, (H10) Suundi, (H40) Mbala

Maho (2009) adds Sonde to L10.

Footnotes

References